Villa María del Triunfo is a district of the Lima Province in Peru. It is located in the Cono Sur area of the city of Lima.
It was officially established as a district on December 28, 1961. The current mayor (alcalde) of Villa María del Triunfo is Eloy Chávez Hernández.

Geography
The district has a total land area of 70.57 km2. Its administrative center is located 158 meters above sea level.

Boundaries
 North: La Molina
 East: Pachacamac
 South: Villa El Salvador and Lurín
 West: San Juan de Miraflores

Demographics
According to a 2002 estimate by the INEI, the district has 329,057 inhabitants and a population density of 4662.8 persons/km2. In 1999, there were 71,889 households in the district.
According to Propoli (http://www.propoli.org/quehacemos.htm) :  
the principal economic activities in the region are timber, restaurants, footwear, clothing, metalworking, tourism.
Undernourishment rate is 14.76%
Population without access to drinking water is 34.05%
Population without electricity is 22.9%

See also 
 Administrative divisions of Peru
 List of mayors of Villa María del Triunfo District

Notes

External links
 
  Official district's web site

Districts of Lima
Shanty towns in South America